Roger Frederick Huffman (November 4, 1929 – April 23, 2018) was an American football coach.  Huffman was the ninth head football coach at Dickinson State College—now known as Dickinson State University–in Dickinson, North Dakota and held that position for three seasons, from 1963 until 1965.  His coaching record at Dickinson State was 15–7–2.

Roger Huffman Track at Dickinson State is named in his honor.

Head coaching record

References

1929 births
2018 deaths
Dickinson State Blue Hawks football coaches
People from Dunn County, North Dakota